Housse de Racket are a musical duo from Paris, France. The band consists of Pierre Leroux and Victor Le Masne.

Biography
Housse de Racket began as session musicians for Air and Phoenix. Their first album Forty Love was released in 2010, their second album Alésia was released in 2011. Alésia was produced by Philippe Zdar of Cassius. In 2015, a third album titled The Tourist followed.

Discography

Studio albums
 Forty Love (2008)
 Alésia (2011)
 The Tourist (2015)

EPs
 Oh Yeah! EP 1 (2008)
 Oh Yeah! EP 2 (2008)

Singles
 Roman (2011)
 Château (2012)
 Aquarium (2012)
 L'incendie (2012)
 The Tourist (2015)
 Turqoise (2015)
 Le Rayon Vert (2016)

References

External links
 

French funk musical groups
French pop music groups
Musical groups from Paris